Peter Mendelsund is a novelist, graphic designer known for his book and magazine covers, and the creative director of The Atlantic. Mendelsund has been described by the New York Times as "one of the top designers at work today" and "the best book designer of his generation" by Wired.

Mendelsund is also the author of five books, including two novels.

Mendelsund is co-founder, along with Emma Cline, of Picture Books, and imprint of Gagosian Gallery and led the founding of Atlantic Editions, a book imprint of The Atlantic magazine.

Biography 
Mendelsund grew up in Cambridge, Massachusetts, the son of Benjamin Mendelsund, and Judith Caton Gimbel. He is the grandson of former labor leader Henoch Mendelsund.

He graduated from Columbia University in 1991 as a philosophy major and received his master's degree in piano performance from the Mannes School of Music.

Following his graduation, he struggled to make a living as a pianist before training himself in graphic design and was hired by Chip Kidd to work at Vintage Books. He was later promoted to associate art director at Alfred A. Knopf and was art director of Pantheon Books and Vertical Press. He has designed critically acclaimed book covers for James Joyce, Vladimir Nabokov, Simone de Beauvoir, Julio Cortázar, Fyodor Dostoevsky, and Stieg Larsson. His book cover for The Girl with the Dragon Tattoo has been praised by The Wall Street Journal as "one of the most instantly recognizable and iconic book covers in contemporary fiction in the U.S."

During his tenure at Knopf, he also designed The Sewanee Reviews first new cover in 73 years. He designed the cover for The New Yorkers May 11, 2015 issue, titled "Injustice: Baltimore, 2015."

In 2019, Mendelsund joined The Atlantic as its creative director, leading its rebranding and the redesign of the magazine.

Mendelsund's most recent book is the novel The Delivery.

References 

Living people
American graphic designers
American people of German-Jewish descent
Jewish American novelists
People from Cambridge, Massachusetts
Columbia College (New York) alumni
The Atlantic (magazine) people
American designers
21st-century American artists
Artists from Cambridge, Massachusetts
Novelists from Massachusetts
Mannes School of Music alumni
Gimbel family
Year of birth missing (living people)